Waleed Al-Mohamed Abdullmuhsin (born 10 July 1961) is a Kuwaiti rower. He competed in the men's single sculls event at the 1988 Summer Olympics.

References

External links

1961 births
Living people
Kuwaiti male rowers
Olympic rowers of Kuwait
Rowers at the 1988 Summer Olympics
Place of birth missing (living people)